Ludvík Ráža (3 October 1929, in Mukachevo – 4 October 2000, in Prague) was a Czechoslovak film director. He directed the film Poslední propadne peklu in 1982.

References

External links

1929 births
2000 deaths
20th-century Czech people
Czech film directors
Czech screenwriters
Male screenwriters
People from Mukachevo
20th-century screenwriters